The 2001 Barber Dodge Pro Series season was the sixteenth season of this racing series. The championship was decided in the final round. Nicolas Rondet won the championship over Sepp Koster and Matt Plumb. Rafael Sperafico won the Rookie of the Year title.

Drivers
All driver use Dodge powered Michelin shod Reynard 98E chassis.

Race calendar and results

Final standings

Notes
 Sepp Koster exceeded track limits after he had puncture. As he broke the rules by exceeding track limits he was classified in last place.

References

2001 in American motorsport